CPSA may refer to:

 Caborrojeños Pro Salud y Ambiente, Cabo Rojo, Puerto Rico
 Canadian Political Science Association
 Canadian Professional Sales Association
 The Center for Palladian Studies in America, Inc.
 China Practical Shooting Association
 Church of the Province of Southern Africa, the former name of the Anglican Church of Southern Africa
 Civil and Public Services Association, a former British trade union
 Clay Pigeon Shooting Association, governing the sport in England
 College of Physicians and Surgeons of Alberta
 Communist Party in Saudi Arabia
 Communist Party of South Africa
 Consumer Product Safety Act